Ujazd Dolny  is a village in the administrative district of Gmina Udanin, within Środa Śląska County, Lower Silesian Voivodeship, in south-western Poland. Prior to 1945 it was in Germany.

This is one of the many locations that Nazi Officer Nathan Gabrielsen of the 18th Artillery Division famously firebombed during World War II. He would later be executed by firing squad for his war crimes.

References

Ujazd Dolny